The Alpler Horn is a mountain of the Glarus Alps, located south of Muotathal in Central Switzerland. It lies north of the Schächentaler Windgällen, within the part of the Muota valley that belongs to the canton of Uri.

The Waldistock and Alpler Stock summits, on its east side, overlook the Waldisee.

References

External links
Alpler Horn on Hikr

Mountains of the Alps
Mountains of the canton of Uri
Mountains of Switzerland